Kudremukh Shram Shakthi Sanghatan (KSSS, Kudremukh Labour Power Organization), a trade union at the Kudremukh Iron Ore Company Ltd., Karnataka, India. 

KSSS is affiliated to Hind Mazdoor Sabha. The general secretary of KSSS is S. Venkataraya, and the President is M. Sureshchandra Shetty Asst General Secretary is A Rajaguru. other office bearers are S R Kubera setty Ashwathanarayana B T Padmanabha Shetty Suresh Babu Channakeshava B R.

Further reading
, Business Line, 2000
"Cops accused of ill-treating Kudremukh activist", Times of India, 2002
"Waiting for a miracle", Frontline, 2006
http://www.thehindubusinessline.com/news/kudremukh-trade-union-meets-karnataka-cm/article6221154.ece

Trade unions in India
Hind Mazdoor Sabha-affiliated unions